Acrobasis modisequa is a species of snout moth in the genus Acrobasis. It was described by Edward Meyrick in 1934. It is found on Java.

References 

Moths described in 1934
Acrobasis
Insects of Java
Moths of Asia